The Palomar–Leiden survey (PLS) was a successful astronomical survey to study faint minor planets in a collaboration between the U.S Palomar Observatory and the Dutch Leiden Observatory, and resulted in the discovery of thousands of asteroids, including many Jupiter trojans.

The original PLS-survey took place in 1960, and was followed by three Palomar–Leiden Trojan survey campaigns, launched in 1971, 1973 and 1977. Its principal investigators were the astronomers Ingrid and Cornelis van Houten at Leiden and Tom Gehrels at Palomar. For the period of the entire survey (1960–1977), the trio of astronomers are credited with the discovery of 4,637 numbered minor planets, which received their own provisional designation, such as 6344 P-L, 4835 T-1 and 3181 T-2.

PLS was one of the most productive minor planet surveys ever conducted: five new asteroid families were discovered, gaps at 1:3 and 2:5 orbital resonances with Jupiter were revealed, and hundreds of photographic plates were taken with Palomar's Samuel Oschin telescope. These plates are still used in their digitized form for the precovery of minor planets today.

Summary 

Approximately 5,500 minor planets were discovered during the Palomar–Leiden survey and its subsequent Trojan campaigns. A total of 4,622 minor planets have been numbered so far and are directly credited to the survey's principal investigators – Cornelis Johannes van Houten, Ingrid van Houten-Groeneveld and Tom Gehrels – by the Minor Planet Center (see ), which is responsible for the designation of minor bodies in the Solar System. Discoveries included members of the Hungaria and Hilda family, which are asteroids from the inner- and outermost regions of the asteroid belt, respectively, as well as a large number of Jupiter trojans.

 P-L  Palomar–Leiden survey (1960), discovered more than 2,000 asteroids (1,800 with orbital information) in eleven nights. This number was increased to 2,400 including 19 Trojans after further analysis of the plates. A total of 130 photographic plates were taken.
 T-1   the first Palomar–Leiden Trojan survey (1971), discovered approximately 500 asteroids including 4 Jupiter trojans in nine nights. A total of 54 photographic plates were taken.
 T-2   the second Palomar–Leiden Trojan survey (1973), discovered another 1,200 asteroids including 18 Jupiter trojans in eight nights. A total of 78 photographic plates were taken.
 T-3   the third Palomar–Leiden Trojan survey (1977), discovered an additional 1,400 asteroids including 24 Jupiter trojans in seven nights. A total of 68 photographic plates were taken.

Naming 

The discovered bodies received a custom provisional designation. For example, the asteroid 2040 P-L is the 2040th minor planet in the original Palomar-Leiden survey, while the asteroid 4835 T-1 was discovered during the first Trojan-campaign. The majority of these bodies have since been assigned a number and many are already named. The custom identifier in the provisional designation "P-L" stands for "Palomar–Leiden", named after Palomar Observatory and Leiden Observatory. For the three Trojan campaigns, the survey designation prefixes "T-1", "T-2" and "T-3" stand for "Trojan".

Surveys 

The PLS was originally intended as an extension of the Yerkes–McDonald asteroid survey (1950–1952), which was initiated by Dutch–American astronomer Gerard Kuiper. While this survey was limited to a magnitude of up to 16, PLS could study minor planets up to a visual magnitudes of 20. However, it only covered a portion of the ecliptic about the vernal equinox, with the target areas selected to minimize the number of background stars. 

Photographic plates taken by Tom Gehrels at the Lunar and Planetary Laboratory in Arizona using the 48-inch Schmidt camera at Palomar Observatory. The orbital elements were computed at the Cincinnati Observatory, which was the site of the Minor Planet Center at the time. All other aspects of the program were conducted at Leiden Observatory in the Netherlands.

Original PLS-survey 

During September and October 1960, the first 130 photographic plates were taken, with each plate spanning  and having a limiting magnitude of 20.5. The Zeiss blink comparator from the Heidelberg Observatory was adapted to perform blink comparison of the plates. This resulted in the discovery of a large number of asteroids; typically 200–400 per plate. A subset of these objects had sufficient data to allow orbital elements to be computed. The mean error in their positions was as small as 0.6″, which corresponded to 0.009 mm on the plates. The resulting mean error in magnitude estimation was 0.19.

Trojan surveys 

The third Palomar–Leiden Trojan survey was performed in 1977, resulting in the discovery of 26 Jupiter trojans. In total, there were three Trojan campaigns, designated T-1, T-2, and T-3, which discovered 3570 asteroids. Another small extension of the survey was reported in 1984, adding 170 new objects for a combined total of 2,403.

List of discovered minor planets

See also 
 List of minor planet discoverers
 National Geographic Society – Palomar Observatory Sky Survey (NGS-POSS)

References 
 

1960 in California
1960 in science
1961 in science
Asteroid surveys
Astronomical surveys